The George F. Johnson Recreation Park Carousel is a historic carousel located at Binghamton in Broome County, New York. The carousel and its pavilion were built in 1925.  The carousel is housed in a wooden, one story, 16-sided, pavilion topped by a cupola.  The carousel has 60 horses standing four abreast, each of which is a "jumper," and two chariots. It was constructed by the Allan Herschell Company and contains its original Wurlitzer Military Band Organ. The carousel was listed on the National Register of Historic Places in 1992.

This carousel, the gazebo, and the entire Recreation Park served as inspiration for Binghamton native Rod Serling's classic Twilight Zone episode "Walking Distance". Serling is honored with a bronze plaque in the floor of the gazebo, as well as with paintings depicting memorable scenes from The Twilight Zone on the carousel.

This is one of six carousels donated to the citizens of Broome County by George F. Johnson (1857–1948), president of Endicott Johnson Corporation. The others, located in the Greater Binghamton Region, are:
 C. Fred Johnson Park Carousel
 George W. Johnson Park Carousel
 Highland Park Carousel
 Ross Park Carousel
 West Endicott Park Carousel

References

External links
 Visiting information on the Broome County carousels

Parks in Broome County, New York
History of Broome County, New York
Carousels on the National Register of Historic Places in New York (state)
National Register of Historic Places in Broome County, New York
Amusement rides introduced in 1925
Buildings and structures in Broome County, New York
Tourist attractions in Broome County, New York